The 2005 German motorcycle Grand Prix was the tenth round of the 2005 MotoGP Championship. It took place on the weekend of 29–31 July 2005 at the Sachsenring.

MotoGP classification
The race, scheduled to be run for 30 laps, was stopped after 5 full laps due to an accident. It was later restarted for 25 laps, with the grid determined by the running order before the suspension. The second part of the race determined the final result.

250 cc classification

125 cc classification
The race, scheduled to be run for 27 laps, was stopped after 20 full laps due to an accident and did not restart as two thirds of the race distance had been completed.

Championship standings after the race (motoGP)

Below are the standings for the top five riders and constructors after round ten was concluded.

Riders' Championship standings

Constructors' Championship standings

 Note: Only the top five positions are included for both sets of standings.

References

German motorcycle Grand Prix
German
Motorcycle Grand Prix